The St. Francis of Assisi Cathedral or just Spanish Cathedral, is a Roman Catholic church that serves as the cathedral church of the apostolic prefecture of Western Sahara (Praefectura Apostolica de Sahara Occidentali). It is located in the city of Laayoune (El Aaiún), Western Sahara, a territory that is in dispute between Morocco and the Sahrawi Arab Democratic Republic.

The church was built in 1954, during the Spanish colonial presence in Spanish Sahara with the design of architect Diego Méndez, author of the project of "Valley of the Fallen" in San Lorenzo de El Escorial in Spain. Today, the cathedral is in the charge of the Oblates of Mary Immaculate and serves the small Spanish community in the city that is still present, as well as serving active personnel of the UN mission in the country.

See also
Roman Catholicism in Western Sahara

References

Roman Catholic cathedrals in Western Sahara
Buildings and structures in Laayoune
Roman Catholic churches completed in 1954
1954 establishments in Spanish Sahara
20th-century Roman Catholic church buildings